Majda Ra'ad (born Margaretha Inga Elisabeth Lind on 5 September 1942) is a Swedish-born Jordanian member of the Hashemite House who is the wife of Prince Ra'ad bin Zeid, the current pretender to the defunct Kingdom of Iraq and Syria and the Lord Chamberlain of Jordan. She is a Jordanian princess by marriage and a member of the House of Hashem.

Early life and family 
Margaretha Inga Elisabeth Lind was born on 5 September 1942 in Arboga to Sven Gustaf Lind and Carin Inga Birgitta Gunlaug Grönwall. Through her mother she is an illegitimate descendant of the House of Vasa through Charles XI of Sweden. She was raised in Södertälje. She studied at Colin Leclaire High School.

Marriage and issue 
Lind married Prince Ra'ad bin Zeid, son of Prince Zeid bin Hussein and Princess Fahrelnissa Zeid, in 1963. They were first married in a civil ceremony on 30 June in Södertälje and religiously at the Raghadan Palace in Amman on 5 August. They have five children:

 Prince Zeid bin Ra'ad – born January 26, 1964, married to Sarah Butler (Now Princess Sarah Zeid). They have 3 children, Prince Ra'ad bin Zeid (Born: 17 May 2001), Princess Hala bint Zeid (Born: 13 March 2003) and Princess Azizah.
 Prince Mired bin Ra'ad – born June 11, 1965, married to Dina Muhammad Khalifeh (Now HRH Princess Dina Mired). They have 3 children, Princess Shirin bint Mired (Born: 19 May 1993), Prince Rakan bin Mired (Born: 20 November 1995) and Prince Jafar bin Mired (Born: 4 September 2002).
 Prince Firas bin Ra'ad – born October 12, 1969, married to Dana Nabil Toukan (Now Princess Dana Firas). They have 3 children, Princess Safa bint Firas (Born: 26 July 2001), Princess Haya bint Firas (Born: 7 March 2003) and Prince Hashem bin Firas (Born: 31 October 2010).
 Prince Faisal bin Ra'ad – born March 6, 1975, graduated from Brown University, and married to Lara Sukhtian (Now Princess ). She worked with MSNBC NBC News in Baghdad covering the Iraq war. She's the daughter of Munjid Sukhtian. They have 3 children, Princess Hanan bint Faisal (Born: 3 September 2006), Princess Mariam bint Faisal (Born: 25 July 2008) and Prince bin Faisal (Born: April 2013).
 Princess Fakhrelnissa bint Ra'ad – born January 11, 1981, graduated from Brown University and UCL. Artist known as Nissa Raad. Married in 2005 (divorced 2017). She has 3 children, Radwan Hajjar (Born: 8 August 2006), Faisal Hajjar (Born: 14 December 2007) and a daughter Lana Hajjar (Born: 30 April 2012).

In 1970, her husband succeeded his father as the head of the Royal Houses of Iraq and Syria and claimant to the defunct throne of Iraq.

Charity and philanthropic work 
In 1971, Majda Ra'ad founded the Al-Hussein Society and serves as its president. From 1985 to 1986 she served as the chairman of the Board of Occupational Therapy College and worked for the Care of Neurological Patients from 1986 until 1996. She has served as the president of Scandinavian Ladies of Amman since 1985 and president of the Jordanian Swedish Friendship Association since 1986. In 1987 she became a member of the Philadelphia Inner Wheel Club. In 1988 she helped found the Petra National Trust. She served as the director of the Bandak Foundation in 1998.

In December 2014, Majda Ra'ad and her husband were patrons of the Embassy of Ukraine in Jordan's Annual Charity Christmas Bazaar.

In October 2015, Majda Ra'ad and her husband participated in a clean up campaign for the Scandinavian Forest in Ain Al Basha.

References 

Living people
1942 births
House of Hashim
House of Vasa
Iraqi princesses
Jordanian princesses
Princesses by marriage
People from Arboga Municipality
Commanders Grand Cross of the Order of the Polar Star
Swedish philanthropists